Andreyevskaya is a rural locality (a village) and the administrative center of Andreyevskoye Rural Settlement, Vashkinsky District, Vologda Oblast, Russia. The population was 201 as of 2002. There are 5 streets.

Geography 
Andreyevskaya is located 28 km north of Lipin Bor (the district's administrative centre) by road. Stanovaya is the nearest rural locality.

References 

Rural localities in Vashkinsky District